Lakin is a surname. People with the surname are as follows:

 Arad Simon Lakin (1810–1890), American Methodist minister, and university president
 B. R. Lakin (1901–1984), American Baptist preacher and evangelist
 Barklie Lakin (1914–2011), British industrialist
 Barry Lakin (born 1973), English footballer
 Charlie Lakin (born 1999), English footballer 
 Charles Ernest Lakin (1878–1972), English physician
 Christine Lakin (born 1979), American actress
 Cyril Lakin (1915–1993), Welsh politician and farmer
 Daniel Lakin (born 1834), American Civil War sailor and Medal of Honor recipient
 George W. Lakin (1816–1884), American schoolteacher and lawyer
 Kenneth Meade Lakin (1941–2014), American physicist
 Mervyn Lakin (1888–1954), Australian politician
 Michael Henry Lakin (1846–1931), British businessman
 Rita Lakin (born 1930), American screenwriter
 Thomas Lakin (1840–??), U.S. Navy officer
 Travis Lakins Sr. (born 1994), American professional baseball player
 William Lakin Turner (1867–1936), English landscape artist